Kelvedon Hatch is a civil parish in the Brentwood borough of Essex, England.

The parish includes the village of Kelvedon Hatch.

Borough of Brentwood
Civil parishes in Essex